Owen Davidson and Billie Jean King were the defending champions, but lost to Jean-Claude Barclay and Françoise Dürr in the final, 6–1, 6–4.

Seeds

  Owen Davidson /  Billie Jean King (final)
  Ion Țiriac /  Ann Jones (quarterfinals)
  Frew McMillan /  Annette Du Plooy (semifinals)
  Bob Hewitt /  Rosemary Casals (semifinals)

  Cliff Richey /  Nancy Richey (quarterfinals, retired)
  Ray Ruffels /  Karen Krantzcke (second round)
  Jean-Claude Barclay /  Françoise Dürr (champions)
  Pierre Darmon /  Rosie Darmon (quarterfinals)

Draw

Finals

Top half

Section 1

Section 2

Bottom half

Section 3

Section 4

References
1968 French Open – Doubles draws and results at the International Tennis Federation

Mixed Doubles
1968